Nicholas David Nurse (born July 24, 1967) is an American professional basketball coach, author and former college basketball player. He is the head coach of the Toronto Raptors of the National Basketball Association (NBA) and the Canadian men's national team.

Early years
Born in Carroll, Iowa, Nurse played at the University of Northern Iowa from 1985 to 1989, appearing in 111 games. He is the school's all-time 3-point percentage leader at .468 (170 of 363). During their successful 1989–90 season, Nurse was the sole student assistant coach for Northern Iowa in his final year with the team. Nurse graduated from Northern Iowa in May 1990 with a B.A. in accounting.

Playing career 
Nurse became a player-coach for the Derby Rams in the British Basketball League during the 1990–91 season; following the 1990–91 season, Nurse never played professionally again, opting to pursue a full-time coaching career.

Coaching career
Nurse got his first full-time head coaching job at Grand View University when he was only 23 years old; at the time, he was the youngest college basketball head coach in the country. He coached at Grand View for two seasons before taking on an assistant coaching role at the University of South Dakota for two seasons.

Nurse later spent 11 seasons coaching in Europe, mostly in the British Basketball League (BBL). During that time, he won two BBL championships as a head coach, one with the Birmingham Bullets in 1996 and one with the Manchester Giants in 2000, while also helping London Towers in the Euroleague. Nurse also won the BBL Coach of the Year Award in the 1999–2000 and 2003–04 seasons. He also coached for the Telindus Oostende of the Ethias League in 1998, as well as became an assistant coach for the Oklahoma Storm of the United States Basketball League in both 2001 and 2005.

D-League
In 2007, Nurse accepted the head coaching job for the Iowa Energy, who were preparing for their first season in the NBA D-League (now called the NBA G League). The Energy won division titles under Nurse in the 2008–09 and 2009–10 seasons.

Iowa State University 
After three seasons with the Energy, Nurse agreed to join the coaching staff of the Iowa State Cyclones as an associate head coach in April 2010. Four days after Nurse's hiring was announced on April 22, Greg McDermott left to become the head coach at Creighton. Nurse was not offered a spot on the new staff, but received $175,000 in a settlement for his four days as an assistant.

Return to the D-League 
Nurse immediately returned to his former position as head coach with the Energy. In the 2010–11 NBA D-League season, Nurse received the Dennis Johnson Coach of the Year Award after helping Iowa achieve the best record in the league (37–13). Nurse and the Energy then went on to win the 2011 D-League championship. Before the 2011–12 season, Nurse left the Energy for the D-League's Rio Grande Valley Vipers. In the 2012–13 season, the Vipers finished with a record of 35–15 and won the D-League finals in a two-game sweep of the Santa Cruz Warriors.

During his six seasons coaching in the D-League, Nurse had 23 players on his rosters called up to the NBA.

NBA
In July 2013, Nurse departed the Vipers for an assistant job on the coaching staff of the Toronto Raptors under Dwane Casey. He was in charge of the offense during his time under Casey, and in the 2017–18 season he was credited for changes to the Raptors offensive game plan which included increases in passing and 3-point attempts. The improved offense helped the Raptors win a franchise-record 59 games, but the team was swept in the second round of the 2018 NBA playoffs by the Cleveland Cavaliers, and Casey was fired shortly thereafter.

On June 14, 2018, the Raptors promoted Nurse to the position of head coach to succeed Casey. In his first season, he guided the Raptors to a 58–24 record, led by offseason acquisition (and eventual Finals MVP) Kawhi Leonard and emerging star Pascal Siakam, who would go on to win the NBA's Most Improved Player award. On May 25, 2019, Nurse coached the Raptors to the 2019 NBA Finals, the first for the franchise, after taking the Eastern Conference Championship by defeating the Milwaukee Bucks in six games. On June 13, Nurse became the first head coach to win both the NBA and NBA G League (formerly D-League) titles, when the Raptors defeated the Golden State Warriors in Game 6 of the NBA Finals, winning the Raptors their first championship in franchise history.

In Nurse's second season, the Raptors finished with a 53–19 record, despite losing Leonard to free agency, in a season shortened by the COVID-19 pandemic. He was widely praised for his creativity and innovation in ensuring that the Raptors were able to maintain a high level of play despite losing Leonard. That season, Nurse qualified to be a head coach in the 2020 NBA All-Star Game as the Eastern Conference representative.  On August 22, 2020, Nurse was named NBA Coach of the Year. However, the Raptors were unable to repeat their playoff success of the previous season, and were eliminated in the Conference Semifinals, losing in 7 games at the hands of the Boston Celtics.

On September 15, 2020, the Raptors announced that Nurse had signed a multi-year contract extension. After an unsuccessful 2020-21 season in which the Raptors played in Tampa Bay due to COVID-19, Nurse guided the team to 48 wins and a return to the playoffs in 2022.

National team career
Nurse was an assistant coach under Chris Finch, for the Great Britain national team from 2009 to 2012, including the 2012 Summer Olympics in London.

On June 24, 2019, Nurse was named the head coach of the Canadian men's national team for the 2019 FIBA World Cup and beyond.

Head coaching record

|- style="background:#FDE910;"
| style="text-align:left;"|Toronto
| style="text-align:left;"|
| 82||58||24|||| style="text-align:center;"|1st in Atlantic||24||16||8||
| style="text-align:center;"|Won NBA Championship
|-
| style="text-align:left;"|Toronto 
| style="text-align:left;"|
| 72||53||19|||| style="text-align:center;"|1st in Atlantic||11||7||4||
| style="text-align:center;"|Lost in Conference Semifinals
|- 
| style="text-align:left;"|Toronto
| style="text-align:left;"|
| 72||27||45|||| style="text-align:center;"|5th in Atlantic||—||—||—||—
| style="text-align:center;"|Missed playoffs
|-
| style="text-align:left;"|Toronto
| style="text-align:left;"|
| 82||48||34|||| style="text-align:center;"|3rd in Atlantic||6||2||4||
| style="text-align:center;"|Lost in First Round
|- class="sortbottom"
| style="text-align:center;" colspan="2"|Career
| 308||186||122|||| ||41||25||16||||

Personal life
Nurse and his wife, Roberta, have two sons, Leo and Rocky Levi. He also has a nephew named David, who previously worked with the Brooklyn Nets before becoming a personal trainer for professional players.

In December 2018, Nurse's mother Marcella died.

Nurse is a lifelong Chicago Cubs fan and was a guest conductor of the seventh-inning stretch at Wrigley Field in 2019, singing "Take Me Out to the Ball Game."

On June 20, 2019, Nurse joined Hamilton-based rock band Arkells at their sold-out Toronto concert to perform a cover of Stevie Wonder's hit song "Signed, Sealed, Delivered (I'm Yours)" on guitar.

In May 2022, after completing his dissertation and comprehensive exam, Nurse graduated from Concordia University Chicago with a Ph.D. in Sports Leadership.

Nurse is a big fan of the late Prince, and was the master of ceremonies at a performance by the New Power Generation in Toronto on July 26, 2022.

Bibliography 
Rapture: Fifteen Teams, Four Countries, One NBA Championship, and How to Find a Way to Win — Damn Near Anywhere Little, Brown and Company (2020) ISBN 978-0316540179

Filmography

Television

References

External links
 Nick Nurse profile at BBL
 College statistics
 

1967 births
Living people
American expatriate basketball people in Belgium
American expatriate basketball people in Canada
American expatriate basketball people in the United Kingdom
American men's basketball coaches
American men's basketball players
Basketball coaches from Iowa
Basketball players from Iowa
Iowa Energy coaches
National Basketball Association championship-winning head coaches
Northern Iowa Panthers men's basketball coaches
Northern Iowa Panthers men's basketball players
People from Carroll, Iowa
Rio Grande Valley Vipers coaches
South Dakota Coyotes men's basketball coaches
Toronto Raptors assistant coaches
Toronto Raptors head coaches
United States Basketball League coaches